Iraqi Democratic Youth Federation (in Arabic: إتحاد الشبيبة الديمقراطي العراقي) is a voluntary youth organization which campaigns for Iraqi youth rights and interests. It is affiliated with the Iraqi Communist Party.

References

External links
Facebook
IDYF website 
1951 establishments in Iraq
Iraqi Communist Party
Youth organizations based in Iraq
Youth organizations established in 1951
ca:Federació de la Joventut Democràtica Iraquiana